Jimmy Flemming (born September 14, 1966) is a retired sprinter who represented the United States Virgin Islands. He competed in the men's 100 metres at the 1988 Summer Olympics.

References

1966 births
Living people
Athletes (track and field) at the 1988 Summer Olympics
United States Virgin Islands male sprinters
Olympic track and field athletes of the United States Virgin Islands
Place of birth missing (living people)